Sudbury schools practice a form of schooling in which students individually decide what to do with their time, and learn as a by-product of ordinary experience rather than through classes or a standard curriculum. Students have complete responsibility for their own education and the school is run by a direct democracy in which students and staff have an equal vote.

The 'Sudbury' name refers to Sudbury Valley School, founded in 1968 in Framingham, Massachusetts. The Sudbury Valley School has been the inspiration for numerous schools many of which refer to themselves as 'Sudbury schools.'

The Sudbury Valley School formally rejects the idea that there can be an official definition or official list of Sudbury schools and in 2016 ended its earlier practice of linking to other schools which claimed to operate in a manner similar to them. Daniel Greenberg, one of the founders of the Sudbury Valley School has written that there are two things that distinguish a Sudbury Model school: everyone is treated equally and there is no authority other than that granted by the consent of the school community.

Current Sudbury schools

Germany
 Neue Schule Hamburg, Hamburg

United Kingdom
 East Kent Sudbury School, Dover

United States
The Circle School, Harrisburg, Pennsylvania
 The Clearwater School, Bothell, Washington
Fairhaven School, Upper Marlboro, Maryland
 The Highland School, Ellenboro, West Virginia
 Houston Sudbury School, Houston
Philadelphia Free School, Philadelphia
Sudbury Valley School, Framingham, Massachusetts
 Three Rivers Village School, Pittsburgh

See also
 Sudbury Valley School
 Sudbury school
 List of democratic schools
 Lists of schools

References

External links
 Self-Directed Democratic Schools List of schools that self-identify as democratic or Sudbury

Democratic education
Alternative education
Sudbury